is a passenger railway station located in the city of Sagamihara, Kanagawa, Japan and operated by the private railway operator Odakyu Electric Railway.

Lines
It lies 44.1 kilometers from the Shinjuku terminus.

Station layout
The station consists of two side platforms serving two tracks, which are connected to the station building by a footbridge.

Platforms

History
Kōza-Shibuya Station was opened on April 1, 1929.

Passenger statistics
In fiscal 2019, the station was used by an average of 25,520 passengers daily.

The passenger figures for previous years are as shown below.

Surrounding area
IKOZA
Yamato City Shibuya Library
Yamato City Hall Shibuya Branch
Kamiwada Wild Bird Forest Park

See also
 List of railway stations in Japan

References

External links

  

Railway stations in Kanagawa Prefecture
Railway stations in Japan opened in 1929
Odakyū Enoshima Line
Railway stations in Yamato, Kanagawa